Rory Dennis Thomas Grand is an English former footballer who played as a goalkeeper. He has a UEFA Goalkeeper B License and is goalkeeper coach.

Coaching career
In his career as a goalkeeping coach, Rory Grand has managed Coventry City Youth, LA Galaxy Academy, Bangkok United, Kerala Blasters, and Svay Rieng.

While at Bangkok United, Grand once led some of these goalkeepers to shine like Supanut Suadsong, who debuted in the Thailand U20 national team, Varuth Wongsomsak who also debuted in the Thailand U20 national team, Sumethee Khokpho who debuted in the Thailand U21 national team, Anusith Termee who was called up by the Thailand U23 national team, and Michael Falkesgaard who debuted in the Philippines national team.

While at Kerala Blasters, he managed to bring Dheeraj Singh to his debut in the India U23 national team.

In Cambodia, he won the Cambodian Premier League in 2019 and led his team's keeper, Sovannarath Aim, to become the Cambodian Premier League goalkeeper of the year in 2019.

References 

Living people
1986 births
English footballers
Association football goalkeepers
Rushall Olympic F.C. players